Autofellatio is the act of oral stimulation of one's own penis as a form of masturbation. Only a limited number of males are physically capable of performing autofellatio.

History
Egyptologist David Lorton says that many ancient texts refer to autofellatio within the religion of Egypt, both in the realm of the gods and among the followers performing religious rituals. According to Lorton, in the Papyrus Bremner-Rhind 28, 20–24, in a document called "Book of Overthrowing Apophis", there is a poem narrating how the sun god Ra had created the god Shu and goddess Tefnut by fellating himself and spitting out his own semen onto the ground. In ancient Egyptian texts, this act is usually performed by the god Atum, and most texts depict only the spitting of the semen or only the masturbation, but not both.

Michel Foucault cites Artemidorus' Oneirocritica as identifying the act of "taking [one's] sex organ into one's [own] mouth" as one of three ways to commit "relations with oneself." Artemidorus thought that dreams of this "unnatural" act portended the death of one's children, loss of one's mistresses, or extreme poverty.

Physical aspects
Few people possess sufficient flexibility and penis length to safely perform the necessary frontbend. However, increased flexibility achieved via gravity-assisted positions, and physical training such as gymnastics, contortion, or yoga may make it possible for some. American biologists Craig Bartle and Alfred Charles Kinsey reported that fewer than 1% of males can successfully orally contact their own penis and that only 2 or 3 men in a thousand could perform a full autofellatio. Previously, autofellatio was considered by behavioristic science a problem rather than as a variety in sexual practice.

References in culture

Autofellatio is a niche in pornography. While relatively few pornographic films involve autofellatio, some pornographic actors are noted for this skill, including Ron Jeremy for his 1970s examples on film. Other actors, including Scott O'Hara, Cole Youngblood, Steve Holmes, and Ricky Martinez, have also been featured performing autofellatio. In Brian W. Aldiss' 1970 semi-autobiographical novel The Hand-Reared Boy, he describes group masturbation practices at a British boys' boarding school. One boy with an especially large penis is capable of fellating himself, a fact which the narrator, Horatio Stubbs, verifies.

Comedian Bill Hicks elaborated an oft-quoted riff on the subject of fellatio, "A woman one night yelled out, 'Yeah, you ever try it?' I said 'Yeah. Almost broke my back.'" Kevin Smith later developed a similar theme ("He broke his neck trying to suck his own dick") in his 1994 debut film Clerks. Writer/director Larry David, in his 1998 film Sour Grapes, used autofellatio as a recurring plot device with several mentions and muted shots of a lead actor fellating himself (back trouble allowing) throughout the movie. In a 26th season (2000–2001) Saturday Night Live sketch, Will Ferrell plays a character who joins a yoga class with the sole purpose of developing the ability to fellate himself as a part of reaching Samadhi. In the 2001 film Scary Movie 2, Professor Dwight Hartman (David Cross) performs autofellatio after rebuffing Theo's (Kathleen Robertson) offer to perform oral sex on him.

The opening sequence of the 2006 film Shortbus shows James (Paul Dawson) fellating himself on videotape; like all of Shortbuss sexual content, the scene was unsimulated.

In 1993, American feminist artist Kiki Smith created a beeswax life-size sculpture titled "Mother/Child" which included a depiction of a man performing autofellatio.

The term may be insulting to a man's masculinity, implying that someone performs autofellatio due either to extremely high self-regard or inability to get someone else to do it for him. This was the sense in which the term was used by President Donald Trump's former White House Communications Director Anthony Scaramucci, when he said of strategist Steve Bannon, "I'm not Steve Bannon, I'm not trying to suck my own cock."

See also

 Autocunnilingus
 Autoeroticism
 Ior Bock
 List of sex positions
 Sexercises

References

External links

 Interview with an Autofellator
 Auto-Fellatio: If You Want Something Done Right, Do It Yourself - An editorial

Masturbation
Sex positions
Fellatio
Male masturbation